Informal Anarchist Federation (FAI) (in Italian: Federazione Anarchica Informale) is an insurrectionary anarchist organization. It has been described by Italian intelligence sources as a "horizontal" structure of various anarchist groups, united in their beliefs in revolutionary armed action. Groups and individuals comprising the FAI act both as separate organizations and also under the FAI, and are known to format group campaigns. The FAI notably shares similar aims and ideals with Conspiracy of Fire Nuclei (Synomosía ton Pyrínon tis Fotiás, abbrev. SPF), the two often working in solidarity with each other, the SPF being known to announce solidarity with FAI in their communiques. The group has its roots in Italy, but, since 2012, has begun executing attacks in various countries across the world.

Consistent with insurrectionary anarchism, the FAI is opposed to capitalism, nationalism, and Marxism.

Structure
The organization is composed of many groups over the world, including:
July 20 Brigade
International Solidarity
Cooperative of Hand-Made Fire & Related Items
May 22 Group
Iniciativa Anarco-Insurreccionalista de Ofensiva y Solidaridad–Julio Chavez López/Federación Anarquista Informal
Revenge Cell Mikhail Zhlobitsky
Circle of Asymmetric Urban Warfare
Santiago Maldonado cell (named after the Argentine Santiago Maldonado)
Anarchic Cell for Revolutionary Solidarity
Friends of the Earth
Práxedis G. Guerrero Autonomous Cells of Immediate Revolution
Mariano Sánchez Añón Insurrectional Cell

These groups represent factions of the FAI. Beyond the organization, each group has also forged its own set of alliances. Due to the organizational nature many of the groups have no materiel connection with each other.

In 2012 an official with the carabinieri ROS claimed that Italian intelligence had located the identities of at least fifty people belonging to the FAI, who are now in hiding.

History
In 2003, the group claimed responsibility for a bomb campaign targeting several European Union institutions. It had stated to target "the apparatus of control that is repressive and leading the democratic show that is the new European order". To address the situation, an order was issued to halt all packets addressed to EU bodies from post offices in the Emilia-Romagna region. Sources at the prosecutor's office in Bologna said that the packages mailed to then head of European Central Bank Jean-Claude Trichet, Europol and European Commission President Romano Prodi Eurojust contained books and photocopies of a leaflet from the Informal Anarchist Federation. The leaflet described the Italian group and talked about its "Operation Santa Claus." After the December attack on the Italian politician Prodi, the FAI sent a letter to La Repubblica newspaper saying it was opposed to the European Union and claiming the attack was carried out "so the pig knows that the maneuvers have only begun to get close to him and others like him."

In 2010, Italy’s postal service intercepted a threatening letter containing a bullet addressed to Prime Minister Silvio Berlusconi. A large envelope containing a letter addressed to Berlusconi with the threat “you will end up like a rat” was discovered on Friday in a post office in the Libate suburb of the northern city of Milan. On 9 April 2013 an explosive device was sent by the group to the offices of La Stampa. It did not detonate. On 23 December 2010, credit for exploding parcels delivered to the Swiss and Chilean embassies in Rome was claimed by the Informal Anarchist Federation, though many news sources erroneously reported that another group, the Italian Anarchist Federation, claimed responsibility for the mail bombs.

On 31 March 2011, a mail bomb exploded at the Olten headquarters of Swissnuclear, the Swiss nuclear industry association, wounding two people. According to prosecutors, a letter delivered with the bomb claimed responsibility on behalf of the FAI.

A mail bomb, sent to Josef Ackermann, chief executive of Deutsche Bank, in Frankfurt am Main, was intercepted on 7 December 2011. On 13 June 2012, the Italian ROS under the name 'Operation ‘Ardire’ conducted raids on forty people, arresting eight in Italy and sending two arrest warrants for individuals already incarcerated in Germany and Switzerland, Gabriel Pombo Da Silva and Marco Camenisch, as well as conducting multiple interrogations, some of which were in connection to Conspiracy of Fire Nuclei.

On the 30 September 2020, The FAI cell Nucleus Mikhail Zhlobitsky claimed to have sent bombs to Multiple locations across Italy.

Adinolfi shooting
In May 2012, 53 year old Roberto Adinolfi, a CEO of the nuclear power company Ansaldo Nucleare was attacked and non-fatally wounded. on Monday 7 May, Adinolfi as he exited his home in Genoa was shot in the knees by two men wearing helmets on a Yamaha motorbike. The attackers fired three shots, fracturing Andinolfi's right knee. The action was claimed by a group calling itself 'Olga Cell of the FAI/FRI' in a four-page communique sent to Italian daily newspaper Corriere della Sera. The cell takes its name from imprisoned SPF member Olga Ikonomidou, and had claimed several other attacks. The shooting (and continued threats against the Italian state tax collection agency) prompted the Italian Interior Minister Annamaria Cancellieri to assign 18,000 police officers to security detail following the attack.

Two anarchists, Alfredo Cospito, 46 and Nicola Gai, 35 were arrested in Turin in mid September 2012 for the attack on Adinolfi. Cospito and Gai were sentenced In November 2013 to 10 years 8 months and 9 years, 4 months respectively for the attack which was assigned a terrorism designation by the court.

International activity
Although the Informal Anarchist Federation in Italy has existed for some time, in recent years several groups around the world have used the moniker to claim responsibility for their own attacks on government and corporate targets, including arson in Russia, Argentina, Indonesia and the United Kingdom. In May 2012, FAI cells in the UK announced their intention to "paralyze the national economy" during the 2012 Summer Olympics in London. This warning followed an attack by the British based FAI cell May 22 Group on trainlines outside Bristol that succeeded in disrupting the rail system, and an arson attack against the Lord Mayor of Bristol, Geoff Gollop. On 3 January 2013 an FAI group set fire to a transmitter in Bath, U.K resulting in television and radio outages to 80,000 homes.  On 25 November 2014 a group calling itself the F.A.I. Torches in the Night – Earth Liberation Front claimed responsibility for setting fires that destroyed 5 luxury cars in the Bristol suburb of Long Ashton.

On 29 May 2012, four Bolivian youths were arrested in connection with a dynamite attack on a Bolivian military barracks and the bombing of a car dealership throughout May. The FAI claimed responsibility for both incidents.

During a security briefing regarding the FAI, an Italian intelligence official cited Greece, Spain, Mexico and Chile as other countries in which the FAI was spreading networks into.  The similarities in ideology between the Italian FAI and a Mexican group involved in a parcel bombing that seriously injured two nanotechnology researchers has been noted elsewhere. In September 2012, an FAI group in Mexico claimed responsibility for the shooting deaths of three municipal police officers in Mexico City.

In addition, the Informal Anarchist Federation has ideological ties with Greek anarchist groups. FAI cells have named themselves after Olga Economidou, a currently imprisoned member of Conspiracy of Fire Nuclei, and Lambros Foundas, a member of Revolutionary Struggle who died in a shoot-out with Greek police in 2010. A document from imprisoned Conspiracy of Fire Nuclei members cites the Italian FAI as an inspiration for their own activity. Consequently, the FAI has praised Conspiracy of Fire Nuclei, stating "Conspiracy’s project, like ours, is based on the action and methods of revolutionary violence."

See also
Individualist anarchism in Europe
Anarchism in Italy
Anarchism in Indonesia
Alfredo Bonanno
Earth Liberation Front
Animal Liberation Front

References

External links
FAI online archive (it)
List of main actions, Ansa News (it)
Organization profile (MIPT) 
Government report on the 2003 bomb campaign

Anarchist Federations
Anarchist militant groups
Anarchist organisations in Italy
Far-left politics in Italy
Insurrectionary anarchism
International anarchist organizations
Left-wing militant groups in Italy
Terrorism in Italy
Terrorism in the United Kingdom